Encyocrypta is a genus of South Pacific brushed trapdoor spiders first described by Eugène Simon in 1889.

Species
 it contains thirty-two species, all found on New Caledonia:
Encyocrypta abelardi Raven, 1994 – New Caledonia
Encyocrypta aureco Raven & Churchill, 1991 – New Caledonia
Encyocrypta berlandi Raven & Churchill, 1991 – New Caledonia
Encyocrypta bertini Raven, 1994 – New Caledonia
Encyocrypta bouleti Raven, 1994 – New Caledonia
Encyocrypta cagou Raven & Churchill, 1991 – New Caledonia
Encyocrypta colemani Raven & Churchill, 1991 – New Caledonia
Encyocrypta decooki Raven & Churchill, 1991 – New Caledonia
Encyocrypta djiaouma Raven & Churchill, 1991 – New Caledonia
Encyocrypta eneseff Raven & Churchill, 1991 – New Caledonia
Encyocrypta gracilibulba Raven, 1994 – New Caledonia
Encyocrypta grandis Raven, 1994 – New Caledonia
Encyocrypta heloiseae Raven, 1994 – New Caledonia
Encyocrypta koghi Raven & Churchill, 1991 – New Caledonia
Encyocrypta kone Raven & Churchill, 1991 – New Caledonia
Encyocrypta kottae Raven & Churchill, 1991 – New Caledonia
Encyocrypta kritscheri Raven & Churchill, 1991 – New Caledonia
Encyocrypta kwakwa Raven, 1994 – New Caledonia
Encyocrypta letocarti Raven & Churchill, 1991 – New Caledonia
Encyocrypta lugubris Raven & Churchill, 1991 – New Caledonia
Encyocrypta mckeei Raven, 1994 – New Caledonia
Encyocrypta meleagris Simon, 1889 (type) – New Caledonia
Encyocrypta montdo Raven & Churchill, 1991 – New Caledonia
Encyocrypta montmou Raven & Churchill, 1991 – New Caledonia
Encyocrypta neocaledonica Raven & Churchill, 1991 – New Caledonia
Encyocrypta niaouli Raven & Churchill, 1991 – New Caledonia
Encyocrypta ouazangou Raven, 1994 – New Caledonia
Encyocrypta oubatche Raven & Churchill, 1991 – New Caledonia
Encyocrypta panie Raven & Churchill, 1991 – New Caledonia
Encyocrypta risbeci Raven, 1994 – New Caledonia
Encyocrypta tillieri Raven & Churchill, 1991 – New Caledonia
Encyocrypta tindia Raven & Churchill, 1991 – New Caledonia

References

Barychelidae
Mygalomorphae genera
Spiders of Oceania
Taxa named by Eugène Simon